In mathematics, a transverse knot is a smooth embedding of a circle into a three-dimensional contact manifold such that the tangent vector at every point of the knot is transverse to the contact plane at that point.

Any Legendrian knot can be C0-perturbed in a direction transverse to the contact planes to obtain a transverse knot.  This yields a bijection between the set of isomorphism classes of transverse knots and the set of isomorphism classes of Legendrian knots modulo negative Legendrian stabilization.

References

J. Epstein, D. Fuchs, and M. Meyer, Chekanov–Eliashberg invariants and transverse approximations of Legendrian knots, Pacific J. Math. 201 (2001), no. 1, 89–106.

Knots and links